Wilhelm Friedrich, Duke of Schleswig-Holstein-Sonderburg-Glücksburg, from 1934 Duke of Schleswig-Holstein (in German: Wilhelm Friedrich Christian Günther Albert Adolf Georg Prinz zu Schleswig-Holstein-Sonderburg-Glücksburg then Prinz zu Schleswig-Holstein; 23 August 1891 – 10 February 1965), was the sixth Duke of Schleswig-Holstein and Head of the House of Oldenburg from 21 January 1934 until his death on 10 February 1965.

Early life

Prince Friedrich was born on 23 August 1891 at Grünholz Castle in Schleswig-Holstein, Prussia. He was the fifth child and only son of Frederick Ferdinand, Duke of Schleswig-Holstein-Sonderbug-Glücksburg and his wife, Princess Karoline Mathilde of Schleswig-Holstein-Sonderburg-Augustenburg.

Prince Friedrich's father was the eldest son of Friedrich, Duke of Schleswig-Holstein-Sonderburg-Glücksburg and a nephew of Christian IX of Denmark. Upon the death of his father in 1885, he had succeeded to the headship of the House of Schleswig-Holstein-Sonderburg-Glücksburg and the title of duke.

Marriage
Friedrich married his second cousin, Princess Marie Melita of Hohenlohe-Langenburg, daughter of Ernst II, Prince of Hohenlohe-Langenburg and his wife Princess Alexandra of Saxe-Coburg and Gotha, on 5 February 1916 at Coburg. Friedrich and Marie Melita had four children.

Later life
When the Head of the House of Schleswig-Holstein-Sonderburg-Augustenburg, Albert, Duke of Schleswig-Holstein, died on 27 April 1931, Friedrich's father Friedrich Ferdinand became the Head of the House of Oldenburg and inherited the title of Duke of Schleswig-Holstein.

On 21 January 1934, Duke Friedrich Ferdinand died, and Friedrich became head of the House of Schleswig-Holstein-Sonderburg-Glücksburg.

Duke Friedrich died on 10 February 1965 in Coburg, Bavaria, West Germany.

Issue
Hans Albrecht, Hereditary Prince of Schleswig-Holstein (12 May 1917 – 10 August 1944)
Prince Wilhelm Alfred Ferdinand of Schleswig-Holstein-Sonderburg-Glücksburg (24 September 1919 – 17 June 1926)
Friedrich Ernst Peter, seventh Duke of Schleswig-Holstein (30 April 1922 – 30 September 1980), married with Princess Marie Alix of Schaumburg-Lippe, and father of the current head of the House of Schleswig-Holstein, Christoph, Prince of Schleswig-Holstein
Princess Marie Alexandra of Schleswig-Holstein-Sonderburg-Glücksburg (9 July 1927 – 14 December 2000)

Ancestry

References

1891 births
1965 deaths
19th-century German people
20th-century German people
Princes of Schleswig-Holstein-Sonderburg-Glücksburg
People from the Province of Schleswig-Holstein